Harold I. Levine was an American mathematician who was professor at Stanford University. He specialized in wave motion and optics.

Levine was born in New York City. After he graduated from the City College of New York, he earned a Ph.D. in Physics from Cornell University. In 1954, he was awarded a Guggenheim fellowship. Levine died on December 10, 2017 at the age of 95.

References

External links

1922 births
2017 deaths
20th-century American mathematicians
21st-century American mathematicians
City College of New York alumni
Cornell University alumni
Scientists from New York City
Mathematicians from New York (state)